Valente is a town in Mozambique lying on the Zambezi River.

Transport 
It is a branch terminus of a railway line on the Mozambique Railway system.

References 

Populated places in Mozambique